"Mad as a hatter" is a colloquial English phrase used in conversation to suggest (lightheartedly) that a person is suffering from insanity. The etymology of the phrase is uncertain, with explanations both connected and unconnected to the trade of hat-making. The earliest known appearance of the phrase in print is in an 1829 issue of Blackwood's Edinburgh Magazine, predating the Hatter from Lewis Carroll's Alice's Adventures in Wonderland by several decades.

Etymology 
There are many theories about the possible origin of the saying:
Mercury poisoning of hat-makers – In 18th and 19th century England, mercury was used in the production of felt, which was commonly used in the hat-making trade at the time. Long-term use of mercury products often resulted in mercury poisoning-induced erethism among hat-makers. In the late 19th-century United States, a notable example occurred in Danbury, Connecticut, where hat making was a major industry. Instances of erethism were so widespread among hat-makers, the condition became known locally as the "Danbury Shakes." It was characterized by slurred speech, tremors, stumbling, and in extreme cases hallucinations.
 An incidence of nominalization of the verb hatter, which means "To harass; to weary; to wear out with fatigue," according to Samuel Johnson's A Dictionary of the English Language, published in 1755. In the text, he cites a passage from the work of John Dryden as an example of usage: "He's hatter'd out with pennance."
 Roger Crab, a 17th-century hermit who, after working for a short time as a hatter, gave all his goods to the poor and wore homemade sackcloth clothes. Although this was presaged by political and religious radicalism, and was followed by a long married life.
 An adaptation of the Anglo-Saxon word atter meaning poison, closely related to the word adder for the poisonous Crossed Viper.  Lexicographers William and Mary Morris in Morris Dictionary of Word and Phrase Origins (1977) favour this derivation because "mad as a hatter" was known before hat making was a recognized trade.  According to A Dictionary of Common Fallacies (1980), "'mad' meant 'venomous' and 'hatter' is a corruption of 'adder', or viper, so that the phrase 'mad as an atter' originally meant 'as venomous as a viper'."

Historical significance
Boston Corbett, who shot Abraham Lincoln's assassin John Wilkes Booth, spent his early life as a hat maker. It is believed that the effects of his early life job affected his decision-making for his future. He was considered "mad as a hatter" for going against orders when he had Booth cornered in a barn in Virginia, and shooting Booth instead of taking him alive. After investigation, Corbett was forgiven for his disobedience, but left the army and went back to hat making. After a few years, Corbett was even more mad than people had once thought, and he was thrown into an insane asylum. Corbett managed to escape, and he was never seen again.

Early uses 
In a section of the January–June 1829 issue of Blackwood's Edinburgh Magazine, headed Noctes Ambrocianæ. No. XL1V, there is a conversation between a group of fictional characters:
NORTH: Many years – I was Sultan of Bello for a long period, until dethroned by an act of the grossest injustice; but I intend to expose the traitorous conspirators to the indignation of an outraged world.
TICKLER (aside to SHEPHERD.): He's raving.
SHEPHERD (to TICKLER.): Dementit.
ODOHERTY (to both.): Mad as a hatter. Hand me a segar.Original text by Project Gutenberg.

Canadian author Thomas Chandler Haliburton used the phrase twice in his 1835 book The clockmaker; or the sayings and doings of Samuel Slick of Slickville: "And with that he turned right round, and sat down to his map and never said another word, lookin' as mad as a hatter the whole blessed time" and "Father he larfed out like any thing; I thought he would never stop – and sister Sall got right up and walked out of the room, as mad as a hatter. Says she, Sam, I do believe you are a born fool, I vow."

See also
 
 Mad hatter disease
 Hatmaking
 The Hatter
 Mad as a March hare

References

English phrases
British English idioms
Quotations from literature
1820s neologisms
Hatmaking
Mental health in fiction